Ultracote is a commercially available light-weight plastic shrink-wrap film available in various color schemes with an adhesive on one side, used to cover and form the surfaces of a model aircraft. The material is cut to size and applied to the aircraft surfaces using a hobby iron or heat gun. This product is also sometimes referred to as Oracover in Europe (also Profilm in United Kingdom).

Ultracote is distributed in the United States and Canada by http://www.horizonhobby.com. Ultracote is not manufactured by Horizon. It is a product manufactured with the trade name Oracover in Europe and manufactured by Lanitz-Prena Folien Factory GmbH http://buegelfolie.de/home.jsp?root_node_id=0&node_id=2005291153607563158 Horizon Hobby Distributors have exclusive distribution rights from the manufacturer for Oracover to be sold as Ultracote in the US and Canada. At one time Ultracote was sold in the United States as Carl Goldberg Ultracote.

See also
 Monokote

External links
 

Radio-controlled aircraft